St. Theresa's Church, Haining is a Roman Catholic church located in the town of Chang'an, Haining, Zhejiang, China.

History 
The church was originally built in 1929 by Chinese believers and belonged to the Roman Catholic Archdiocese of Hangzhou.

In January 2017, it was declared a provincial cultural relic preservation organ by the Zhejiang government.

Architecture 
The church is seven rooms wide with a Gothic style.

References

Further reading 
 
 

Churches in Zhejiang
1929 establishments in China
Roman Catholic churches completed in 1929
Tourist attractions in Jiaxing
20th-century Roman Catholic church buildings in China
Gothic Revival church buildings in China